Winninowie Conservation Park is a protected area in the Australian state of South Australia located on the east coast of Upper Spencer Gulf about  south by east of Port Augusta and  northwest of Port Germein, in the locality of Miranda. The conservation park was proclaimed in 1990 for the purpose of conserving ‘excellent examples of several coastal and marine ecosystems with sub-tropical affiliations in a temperate environment’ including ‘significant stands of the grey mangrove, Avicennia marina var. resinifera, seagrass and samphire salt marsh communities’. The conservation park's boundaries overlap with those of the Yatala Harbour Upper Spencer Gulf Aquatic Reserve. The conservation park is classified as an IUCN Category Ia protected area.

References

External links
Winninowie Conservation Park webpage on protected planet

Conservation parks of South Australia
Protected areas established in 1990
1990 establishments in Australia
Spencer Gulf